Gnathophis bracheatopos, the longeye conger, is an eel in the family Congridae (conger/garden eels). It was described by David G. Smith and Robert H. Kanazawa in 1977. It is a tropical, marine eel which is known from the United States (South Carolina to Florida) and the eastern Gulf of Mexico, in the western Atlantic Ocean. It dwells at a depth range of 55–110 meters. Males can reach a maximum total length of 35 centimeters.

References

bracheatopos
Taxa named by David G. Smith
Taxa named by Robert H. Kanazawa
Fish described in 1977